Jasminum adenophyllum, commonly known as the bluegrape jasmine, pinwheel jasmine, or princess jasmine, is a species of jasmine, belonging to the olive family.

Distribution 
The bluegrape jasmine is a relatively rare species of jasmine mostly found in parts of northeast India (especially Assam and Meghalaya), but also discovered in Laos, Malaysia, Thailand and Vietnam.

Description 
The bluegrape jasmine is a fast-growing climbing vine, but can also grow as ground cover. It is a tropical plant. It has dark green, glossy leaves of length 5–7 cm (1.9–2.8 in), and bears grape-sized blue-black berries which attract birds. The species produces large white flowers, typically having narrow, curled petals. They are very fragrant and attractive to bees and butterflies.

References 

adenophyllum